Camoyidae is a family of nematodes belonging to the order Rhabditida.

References

Nematodes